The Church of Jesus Christ of Latter-day Saints in Zambia refers to the Church of Jesus Christ of Latter-day Saints (LDS Church) and its members in Zambia. At year-end 1992, there were about 100 members in Zambia. In 2021, there were 5,053 members in 17 congregations.

History 

The Zimbabwe Harare Mission President, Vern Marble, went to Zambia to search for a couple who had been baptized in England, which they found with assistance from a taxi driver. In April 1992, Dean and Ruth Harrison were sent to Zambia as missionaries. In July, the Church again received legal recognition. The Lusaka Branch was organized on July 14, 1992 which had a membership around 50. On August 20, 1992, Elder Russell M. Nelson of the Quorum of the Twelve Apostles visited Zambia and dedicated the country for the preaching of the gospel. By year-end 1992, there were about 100 members in Zambia.

The Church seminary program was established in Zambia in 1995. By year-end 1997, membership had grown to over 500. A second Branch was organized in Lusaka, named the Libala Branch around 1997 to accommodate the increase in membership. The first Church building was dedicated in Lusaka in 1998.

Branches of the Church were organized in three major cities in the Zambian Copperbelt, in Luanshya on October 27, 2002 and then in Kitwe and N'Dola on December 1, 2002 which were organized into a district in 2005. The Lusaka Zambia District was organized, with 5 branches, on 16 February 2003 which became a stake on March 15, 2015.

In 2009, the Church's Perpetual Education Fund was brought to Zambia for the first time. The purpose of this funds is to assist youth in developing areas in effort to move them out of the cycle of poverty. Zambia became the 43rd country to offer the Perpetual Education Fund.

In 2016, Goma Radio Station, in Luanshya allocated 2 days per week where Church leaders and public affairs representatives spoke on two topics: Self reliance on Tuesdays and For the Strength of the Youth on Thursdays.

Stake and Districts 

As of February 2023, the following stake and districts were located in Zambia:

Lusaka Zambia Stake
 Chainama Ward
 Kasupe Branch
 Libala Ward
 Lilanda Ward
 Lusaka Ward
 Matero Ward
 Munali Ward

Kitwe Zambia District
 Kawama Branch
 Kitwe Branch

Ndola Zambia District
 Chifubu Branch
 Luanshya Branch
 Masala Branch
 Ndola Branch
 Roan Branch
 Twapia Branch

Other Congregations

The Zambia Lusaka Mission Branch serves individuals and members not in proximity to a meetinghouse, and is not part of a stake or district.

Congregations not within a stake are named branches, regardless of size.

Mission 
Zambia was administered by Zimbabwe Harare Mission when proselyting begun in 1991. The Zambia Lusaka Mission was organized on July 1, 2011. The mission also includes Malawi.

Temples 
As of February 2023, Zambia was located in the Johannesburg South Africa Temple District. As of February 2023, a temple in Harare Zimbabwe is under construction which is considerably closer than Johannesburg.

References

External links 
 The Church of Jesus Christ of Latter-day Saints Africa South Area
 The Church of Jesus Christ of Latter-day Saints - Visitors Site

Christian denominations in Zambia
The Church of Jesus Christ of Latter-day Saints in Africa